Alone (or Fad, literally "twin") is a 2007 Thai horror film written and directed by Banjong Pisanthanakun and Parkpoom Wongpoom. Alone stars Thai-German pop singer Marsha Vadhanapanich in her first film role in 15 years.

Plot
Pim and Ploy are twin sisters both conjoined at the stomach. Pim is very sweet, caring, and protective, especially of Ploy, though Ploy's nature is generally harsh and cold. The girls have a very close bond and promised each other to stay together until they die.

While they are staying in a hospital, Pim and Ploy meet a boy named Wee. The girls display mutual affection for him, but Wee only confesses his love for Pim, much to Ploy's jealousy. After his recovery from an illness, Wee decides that he wants to see Pim one last time before leaving the hospital and visiting the twins' room. As much as Pim wants to see Wee, Ploy refuses to get out of bed and succumbs to a fit of jealous rage. Wee gets upset and leaves. Angry and in tears, Pim demands that she and Ploy be separated. To do so, the twins undergo surgery, which Ploy does not survive. Pim burdens herself with guilt thinking that if she had not wanted an operation, Ploy would still be alive.

Years later, Pim married Wee and the couple live in South Korea. She receives a phone call from Thailand that her mother has had a stroke. When Pim and Wee return to Thailand, a series of odd events begin to happen, and Pim believes that the ghost of Ploy is behind them all. When she tells Wee her theory, he becomes very worried and starts seeking psychiatric help for Pim. But even after the psychiatrist came to visit Pim, she still experiences the hauntings, and what Wee believes to be hallucinations. The hauntings escalate from moving objects and voices to Pim coming in contact with Ploy; Pim hears her breathing on her side while she sleeps, she sees Ploy in the mirror instead of herself, while on an elevator she sees Ploy resting her head on her shoulder, and is nearly drowned by Ploy while taking a bath. Pim feels incredibly guilty and becomes a recluse, with Wee not being very sure about what's wrong with her. However, Ploy's ghost then begins haunting Wee as well.

One night, Wee goes to see Pim's mother who reveals that Pim is actually Ploy. In a flashback, Ploy strangles Pim out of jealousy after Pim demanded they be separated. But when Pim dies, Ploy suddenly snaps out of her rage and feels shocked at what she did. She screams for help from her mother, who is devastated over Pim's death and never speaks to Ploy again. To save Ploy's life, doctors had to separate Pim's corpse from Ploy's body. Ploy assumed Pim's identity in order to be with Wee. It meant that all these years, Ploy was lying to Wee and it was actually Pim's ghost that was haunting her and Wee. Ploy's mother was fully aware of her actions as well but kept silent. Later, it is shown that Ploy killed her mother by disconnecting her oxygen pipe so she could not tell Wee the truth. Ploy had no idea that her mother had told Wee the truth beforehand.

Wee confronts Ploy, and in a moment of guilt, she tells Wee the truth. Wee is disgusted and shocked at Ploy's actions and decides to leave her, but Ploy knocks him unconscious and takes Wee hostage. However, Wee escapes, and the ensuing fight with Ploy causes the house to catch fire. Wee throws a shelf on Ploy and escapes. Trapped underneath, Pim's ghost confronts and holds Ploy down, and as the burning debris rains down around them, Pim smiles and Ploy dies.

Wee visits the twins' grave and takes out Pim's necklace that he had given her as a gift when they were in the hospital. He places it on their tombstone.

Cast
 Marsha Vadhanapanich as Pim and Ploy
 Vittaya Wasukraipaisan as Wee
 Ruchanu Boonchooduang as Pim's and Ploy's mother
 Hatairat Egereff as Pim, age 15
 Rutairat Egereff as Ploy, age 15
 Chutikan Vimuktananda as Pim, age 7
 Chayakan Vimuktananda as Ploy, age 7
 Namo Tongkumnerd as Wee, age 15
 Joel Piercey as Ryang

Box office
Like Pisanthanakun and Wongpoom's previous film Shutter, Alone opened at #1 at the Thai  Box Office grossing $960,000 before falling to #2 grossing $411,043. In total the film grossed $2,040,003 in Thailand becoming the 21st highest grossing film of the year. The film fared even better internationally grossing $9,365,071 worldwide out grossing the directors which made all other movies fall behind previous film Shutter.

Festivals and awards
Since its general release in Thailand cinemas, Alone has made the rounds at film festivals, playing at the 2007 Bangkok International Film Festival. At Fantastic Fest in Austin, Texas, the film won awards for best director and best actress. It swept the awards at the 2007 Screamfest Horror Film Festival in Los Angeles, winning Best Picture, Best Director, Best Cinematography and Best Editing. The film also won the top Audience Award for Best Feature Film at the 2007 Toronto After Dark festival.

Soundtrack
The closing credits feature a song by Marsha Wattanapanich, "Suan Neung Khong Chan (A Part of Me)".

DVD release
Alone has been released on Region 3 DVD in Hong Kong by Asia Video, with the original soundtrack and English and Traditional Chinese subtitles.

Remakes
Alone has been remade 5 times, 4 in Indian languages:
 The 2007 Indian Malayalam film Nadiya Kollappetta Rathri was also inspired from this film where Kavya Madhavan played the twins.
 Chaarulatha (2012), Indian film made in Kannada and Tamil languages. Priyamani played the conjoined twins.
Geethaanjali (2013), Indian film made in Malayalam language was made after buying the remake right. Keerthy Suresh played the twins.
 Alone (2015), Indian film made in Hindi language. Bipasha Basu played the twins.

Also with an International remake:

 The 2012 Filipino film Guni-Guni have been described as having similarities in plot to Alone where Lovi Poe played the role of the twins.

See also
 List of ghost films

References

External links 
Official site 
Official site

2007 films
Films directed by Banjong Pisanthanakun
GMM Tai Hub films
Thai-language films
Thai horror films
2007 horror films
Fictional conjoined twins
Thai films remade in other languages